The fraternities and sororities of Dalhousie University are well established and active in the Halifax community. Dalhousie previously had a policy against recognizing organizations who used gender identity as part of their membership criteria. However, this policy has since been changed and Greek Organizations can now be recognized at an official capacity. To date one organization has completed the ratification process and is officially recognized  as astudent society at Dalhousie. This organization is Tau Lambda Xi sorority. 

Many of the international organizations have considered completing the ratification process but have not due to the agreement that once ratified the DSU constitution will supersede their own. 

Prior to this policy change a number of fraternities and sororities collectively formed the Greek Council, and as a result of its multi-gendered standing, was able to become a ratified society under the Dalhousie Student Union. Greek Council became obsolete due to the policy change.
The following is a list of fraternities and sororities with a presence at Dalhousie:

See also
Dalhousie University
Dalhousie Student Union
Fraternities and sororities

References

External links
 Zeta Psi, Alpha Mu Chapter
 Sigma Chi 

Dalhousie University
Dalhousie University